Valdeno Brito (born June 29, 1974 in Campina Grande) is a Brazilian racing driver. He has raced in such series as Porsche Supercup and Stock Car Brasil.

Racing record

Complete Porsche Supercup results
(key) (Races in bold indicate pole position) (Races in italics indicate fastest lap)

‡ – As Brito was a guest driver, he was ineligible to score points.

Complete Stock Car Brasil results

References

External links
 
 

1974 births
Living people
People from Campina Grande
Brazilian racing drivers
Formula 3 Sudamericana drivers
Stock Car Brasil drivers
Porsche Supercup drivers
TC 2000 Championship drivers
Blancpain Endurance Series drivers
Súper TC 2000 drivers
Sportspeople from Paraíba
Porsche Carrera Cup Germany drivers